Label Information Base (LIB) is the software table maintained by IP/MPLS capable routers to store the details of port and the corresponding MPLS router label to be popped/pushed on incoming/outgoing MPLS packets.

Entries are populated from label-distribution protocols.

LIB functions in the control plane of router's MPLS layer. It is used by the label distribution protocol for mapping the next hop labels.

MPLS networking